B. densifolia may refer to:

 Babingtonia densifolia, a flowering plant
 Berkheya densifolia, a flowering plant
 Brunfelsia densifolia, a nightshade native to Puerto Rico